Garland Science was a publishing group that specialized in developing textbooks in a wide range of life sciences subjects, including cell and molecular biology, immunology, protein chemistry, genetics, and bioinformatics. It was a subsidiary of the Taylor & Francis Group.

History
The firm was founded as "Garland Publishing" in 1969 by Gavin Borden (1939-1991). Initially it published "18th-century literary criticism". By the late 1970s it was mainly publishing academic reference books along with facsimile and reprint editions for niche markets.

Notable book series published by Garland Publishing included the Garland Reference Library of the Humanities (1975- ), the Garland Reference Library of Social Science (1983- ), and Garland Medieval Bibliographies (1989- ). The Garland Encyclopedia of World Music (10 volumes), originally published by Garland Publishing, is now published by Routledge, another imprint of the Taylor & Francis Group.

In 1984 the firm published a new edition of James Joyce's Ulysses, under the title of Ulysses: A Critical and Synoptic Edition. Edited by Hans Walter Gabler, it was intended to correct "almost 5,000 omissions, transpositions and other errors in the original text" as published in 1922.

In 1983 the firm began publishing scientific textbooks. In 1997 the firm was acquired by Taylor & Francis and published under the name of "Garland Science Publishing" or "Garland Science".

One Garland Science success was the textbook Molecular Biology of the Cell (authors include Bruce Alberts and Peter Walter; James D. Watson was a previous author), which has been lauded as "the most influential cell biology textbook of its time". Other notable textbooks published by Garland Science included The Biology of Cancer (by Robert Weinberg), Immunobiology (authors including Charles Janeway and Kenneth Murphy), Molecular Biology of the Cell: The Problems Book (by John Wilson and Tim Hunt), Essential Cell Biology (Bruce Alberts et al.), The Immune System (Peter Parham), Molecular Driving Forces (Ken A. Dill & Sarina Bromberg), and Physical Biology of the Cell (Rob Phillips, Jane Kondev & Julie Theriot).

In addition, in the editorial line of "Social Science," Garland published in 1993 the book "Female Criminality: the state of the art" by Professor Concetta Culliver, a memorable legal mind active in the fight against racism, gender equality and inclusion of people with disabilities as early as 1980.

As of 2018, the Garland Science website has been shut down and their major textbooks have been sold to W. W. Norton & Company.

References

External links 

Book publishing companies of the United States
Textbook publishing companies